Sofianna Sundelin (born 13 January 2003) is a Finnish ice hockey player and member of the Finnish national ice hockey team, currently playing in the Naisten Liiga with Team Kuortane.

Playing career
Sundelin began playing ice hockey with the junior department of HC Ässät in Pori, the western neighbor of her hometown of Ulvila, in southwestern Finland near the Bothnian Bay.

She has played in the Naisten Liiga (NSML) with Team Kuortane since 2018. , she is second on the list of all-time points scored for Team Kuortane.

International play
Sundelin represented Finland at the IIHF Women's World U18 Championships in 2019 and 2020, winning a bronze medal at the 2019 tournament. She made her senior national team debut at the 2021 IIHF Women's World Championship, contributing an assist to Finland’s bronze medal performance.

Career statistics

Regular season and playoffs

International

References

External links 
 
 

Living people
2003 births
People from Ulvila
Finnish women's ice hockey forwards
Team Kuortane players
Ice hockey players at the 2022 Winter Olympics
Olympic ice hockey players of Finland
Olympic bronze medalists for Finland
Olympic medalists in ice hockey
Medalists at the 2022 Winter Olympics
Ässät Naiset players
Sportspeople from Satakunta